Fatoe Switie Mountains is a mountain range in the Sipaliwini District of Suriname. The highest peak is about 375 metres.

In 1902, Governor Cornelis Lely of Suriname decided that the Lawa Railway would be built by the government. The railway line would transport gold from the foot of the Fatoe Switie Mountains to Paramaribo. The proposed  railway line was only half completed from Paramaribo due to disappointing gold finds.

References

Mountain ranges of Suriname